Charles Francis Carpentier (September 19, 1896 – April 3, 1964) was an American businessman and politician.

Biography
Born in Moline, Illinois on September 19, 1896.

Carpentier served in the United States Army during World War I. He went to St. Ambrose University. Thogether his brother, he owned and operated movie theaters and drive-in movie theaters in the Quad Cities area. In 1924, Carpentier was elected to East Moline, Illinois' city council. In 1929 was elected mayor of East Moline. In 1938, Carpentier was elected to the Illinois State Senate as a Republican. Then, in 1952, Carpentier was elected Illinois Secretary of State and served until his death in 1964.

While running for governor of Illinois in the state's 1964 gubernatorial election, Carpentier suffered a heart attack. He withdrew from the race afterward. Carpentier died on April 3, 1964, in Springfield, Illinois of a heart attack.

Legacy
Carpentier's son Donald D. Carpentier also served in the Illinois General Assembly.

References

External links

1896 births
1964 deaths
People from East Moline, Illinois
People from Moline, Illinois
Military personnel from Illinois
St. Ambrose University alumni
Businesspeople from Illinois
Mayors of places in Illinois
Illinois city council members
Republican Party Illinois state senators
Secretaries of State of Illinois
20th-century American politicians
20th-century American businesspeople
United States Army personnel of World War I